Michael C. Murphy may refer to:

 Mike Murphy (trainer and coach) (Michael Charles Murphy, 1860–1913), trainer of boxing champion John L. Sullivan, first Michigan Wolverines football coach, and the "father of American track athletics"
 Michael C. Murphy (New York politician) (1839–1903), New York politician and Medal of Honor recipient
 Michael C. Murphy (Michigan politician) (1952–2014), member of the Michigan House of Representatives